Auzatellodes is a genus of moths belonging to the subfamily Drepaninae.

Species
Auzatellodes arizana (Wileman, 1911)
Auzatellodes hyalinata (Moore, [1868])
Auzatellodes theafundum  Holloway, 1998

References

Drepaninae
Drepanidae genera